Carlos Alberto de Sousa Lopes, GCIH (born 18 February 1947) is a Portuguese former long-distance runner.

He won the marathon at the 1984 Summer Olympics in Los Angeles, becoming Portugal's first Olympic gold medalist and setting an Olympic record for the event.

In 1985, Lopes set the marathon world record at 2:07:12 at the Rotterdam Marathon.

Early life
Lopes was born in Vildemoinhos, near Viseu, Portugal. He worked as a stonecutter's helper.

Lopes wanted to play football at his local club, but his father opposed this, so he turned to other forms of athletics. In 1967 he was invited to join the athletics team of Sporting Clube de Portugal, and remained there until the end of his career in 1985.

Career
Lopes won the World Cross Country Championships in Chepstow, Wales in 1976.

At the 1976 Summer Olympics in Montreal, Lopes competed in the 10,000 metres. In the race, Lopes set the pace from the 4000 metres mark, and the only athlete to follow him was defending double Olympic champion Lasse Virén. Virén passed Lopes with a lap to go to win the gold medal, and Lopes finished a comfortable second.

During the race, Lopes ran the first 5,000 metres in 14:08.94, and the second 5,000 metres in 13:36.23, a remarkable proof of his ability to steadily accelerate his pace.  What he generally lacked in the track races, however, was an ability to sharply increase his pace in the final lap or so.

In the following year, Lopes finished second to Leon Schots in World Cross Country Championships in Düsseldorf, Germany.

Afterward, Lopes had several injuries and did not qualify for 1980 Summer Olympics in Moscow.

In 1982, Lopes returned to top form, and in Oslo, Norway, he broke the 10,000 metres European record with a time of 27:24.39, which belonged to his teammate Fernando Mamede.

At the 1982 European Athletics Championships in Athens, Greece, Lopes finished fourth in the 10,000 metres with a time of 27:47.95, behind the winner Alberto Cova. During the race, he set the pace from 6,000 metres to 9,800 metres before being overtaken on the final lap.

Lopes attempted his first marathon at the 1982 New York City Marathon, but he did not finish due to an accident in which he ran into a spectator.

In 1983, he finished second at the World Cross Country Championships in Gateshead, England.

Lopes ran his second marathon at the Rotterdam Marathon in 1983.  He finished second in a European record time of 2:08:39, two seconds behind the race winner, Robert de Castella. He then decided to run the 10,000 metres at the 1983 World Championships in Helsinki, Finland, where he finished sixth behind the winner Alberto Cova. After that he decided to concentrate on the marathon and cross country.

In 1984, Lopes won his second World Cross Country Championships in East Rutherford, United States. In Stockholm, Sweden, he paced teammate Fernando Mamede to break Henry Rono's 10,000 metres world record of 27:22.50. Mamede won in 27:13.81 with Lopes finishing second in 27:17.48.

An accident almost prevented Lopes from participating in the 1984 Summer Olympics in Los Angeles when, a week before the Games, he was run over by a car in Lisbon but he was not hurt.

The Olympic marathon at Los Angeles was run in very warm conditions, and as the favorites gradually fell away, Lopes won the gold medal with a 200 metres advantage and in an Olympic record time of 2:09:21 at the age of 37.  This victory established his reputation as a world class runner, because he ran the last  at an average speed of 2:55 per km (4:42 per mile), a remarkably quick pace at the end of a marathon. Lopes' Olympic record stood until the 2008 Summer Olympics in Beijing, China, when Kenyan Sammy Wanjiru won with a time of 2:06:32.

In 1985, Lopes won the World Cross Country Championships in Lisbon, Portugal for the third and final time in his career.

In the last major competitive race of his career, the 1985 Rotterdam Marathon, Lopes took 53 seconds off the world's best marathon time with a winning time of 2:07.12, and becoming the first man to run 42.195 km in less than 2:08.00.

 L'Équipe: "Fantastic! Extraordinary! There aren't enough strong words to label Lopes Rotterdam achievement. In less than 3 years, he became the first man to approach the unreal. Who would think, 20 years ago, that a man would run the marathon at 20 km/h?"'
 Rotterdam press: "With his magic talent, Carlos Lopes took 54 seconds off the previous world best. With his fabulous pace he reached the world record with apparent ease. It's said he received US$150,000 just to come to Rotterdam, plus US$67,000 in prizes. A lot of money for a single man. But, in marathon's fantasy world, only a man—aged 38—is able to run it in 2:07.12: Carlos Lopes".''

Orders
 Grand Cross of the Order of Prince Henry

Popular culture
 Lopes appears in the 14th episode of season 12 of The Simpsons, as Homer is watching a documentary about the Olympics' greatest moments on TV. Lopes is credited with being the oldest ever winner of the marathon, at 38, and inspires Homer, who claims to be almost his age, to enter the Springfield Marathon. Lopes was actually 37 when he won the 1984 Olympic marathon.

References

External links
Profile
Lisbon 2005/Carlos Lopes – Gold Marathon Memorial
www.olympics.org

1947 births
Living people
Portuguese male long-distance runners
Portuguese male marathon runners
Olympic athletes of Portugal
Olympic gold medalists for Portugal
Olympic silver medalists for Portugal
Athletes (track and field) at the 1972 Summer Olympics
Athletes (track and field) at the 1976 Summer Olympics
Athletes (track and field) at the 1984 Summer Olympics
World record setters in athletics (track and field)
People from Viseu
World Athletics Cross Country Championships winners
World Athletics Championships athletes for Portugal
Medalists at the 1984 Summer Olympics
Medalists at the 1976 Summer Olympics
Olympic gold medalists in athletics (track and field)
Olympic silver medalists in athletics (track and field)
Portuguese male cross country runners
Sportspeople from Viseu District